Tubbia, is a genus of the family Centrolophidae.

Species
There are currently 2 recognized species in this genus:
 Tubbia stewarti Last, R. K. Daley & Duhamel, 2013 (Seamount rudderfish) 
 Tubbia tasmanica Whitley, 1943 (Tasmanian ruffe)

References

Centrolophidae
Perciformes genera